Diana: Her True Story is a 1993 biographical drama television film based on the life of Diana, Princess of Wales. It is based on the book of the same name by Andrew Morton, who also served as screenwriter and producer of the adaptation.

Cast

Starring
 Serena Scott Thomas as Princess Diana
 David Threlfall as Prince Charles

Also starring
 Elizabeth Garvie as Camilla Parker Bowles
 Donald Douglas as Prince Philip, Duke of Edinburgh
 Jemma Redgrave as Carolyn Bartholomew
 Jeremy Child as Alfred Drake-Kinney
 William Franklyn as Lord Mountbatten
 Jean Anderson as Lady Fermoy
 Anne Stallybrass as Queen Elizabeth II

Co-starring
 Belle Connor as Diana Spencer (age 6)
 Tracy Hardwick as Sarah Ferguson
 Aletta Lawson as Princess Anne
 Cornelia Hayes O'Herlihy as Jane Spencer
 Helen Masters as Sarah Spencer
 Gabrielle Blunt as The Queen Mother
 Christopher Bowen as James Gilbey
 Robert Reynolds as Sergeant Mannakee
 Rowland Davies as Earl Spencer
 Adam Blackwood as Christopher
 Alan Shearman as Reporter 1
 David Ryall as Reporter 2

Featuring
 Jeffrey Harmer as Prince Andrew
 Robin Hart
 Anthony Calf 
 Georgia Reece
 Harvey Ashby
 Nicholas Bastian
 Barclay Wright
 John Vine
 Tessa Shaw as Countess Spencer

Production

Competition
The American ABC network was quicker off the mark, and soon after Morton's book Diana: Her True Story was published in May 1992, the television movie Charles and Diana: Unhappily Ever After went into production, and aired for the first time in December 1992.

References

External links 

1993 British television series debuts
1993 British television series endings
1990s British drama television series
1990s British television miniseries
Films about Diana, Princess of Wales
British biographical films
NBC network original films
Sky UK original programming
English-language television shows
Television shows set in the United Kingdom
Films directed by Kevin Connor
Cultural depictions of Diana, Princess of Wales
Cultural depictions of Charles III
Cultural depictions of Elizabeth II
Cultural depictions of Louis Mountbatten, 1st Earl Mountbatten of Burma